Jacob Cornelis (Jaap) Vegter (21 June 1932, Voorburg - 14 January 2003, The Hague) was a Dutch cartoonist. He was the winner of the 1979 Stripschapprijs.

References

1932 births
2003 deaths
Dutch cartoonists
People from Voorburg
Winners of the Stripschapsprijs